This is a list of notable events in country music that took place in the year 1936.

Events 
In Knoxville, Tennessee the emerging media chain Scripps-Howard purchased the WNOX station in 1935, and then in 1936 the station launched its most popular program, the influential Mid-Day Merry-Go-Round, a live noontime performance show which highlighted hillbilly music artists.

Lee Roy "Lasses" White of Wills Point, TX, who was featured on the Nashville radio station WSM, with "Honey" Wilds, and they were featured in their own Friday night "minstrel show and on The Grand Ole Opry, left for Hollywood in May 1936. He found a career as a character actor in the B-Grade Western "horse operas".

Top Hillbilly (Country) Recordings

The following songs were extracted from records included in Joel Whitburn's Pop Memories 1890-1954, record sales reported on the "Discography of American Historical Recordings" website, and other sources as specified. Numerical rankings are approximate, they are only used as a frame of reference.

Births 
 January 2 – Roger Miller, singer-songwriter best known for honky-tonk novelty songs, and the non-novelty "King of the Road" (died 1992).
 February 27 – Chuck Glaser, 83, member of Tompall and the Glaser Brothers (died 2019).
 March 9 – Mickey Gilley, pianist and nightclub owner who enjoyed success throughout the 1970s and 1980s; cousin of Jerry Lee Lewis and Jimmy Swaggart.
 April 22 – Glen Campbell, pop-country singer and guitarist, host of The Glen Campbell Goodtime Hour (died 2017).
 May 25 – Tom T. Hall, singer-songwriter who became known as "The Storyteller."
 June 22 – Kris Kristofferson, singer-songwriter and actor who grew to fame in the late 1960s and early 1970s.
 July 24 – Max D. Barnes, songwriter and record producer whose peak came in the 1980s and early 1990s (died 2004).
 November 5 – Billy Sherrill, record producer for numerous acts in the 1960s through 1980s, most famously Tammy Wynette (died 2015).
 December 12 – Reggie Young, session guitarist (died 2019).

References

Further reading
 Kingsbury, Paul, "Vinyl Hayride: Country Music Album Covers 1947–1989," Country Music Foundation, 2003
 Millard, Bob, "Country Music: 70 Years of America's Favorite Music," HarperCollins, New York, 1993
 Whitburn, Joel. "Top Country Songs 1944–2005 – 6th Edition." 2005.

Country
Country music by year